The London and North Western Railway (LNWR) Class G were several related classes of 0-8-0 steam locomotives. These 0-8-0s were the principal work-horses for freight traffic on the latter-day London & North Western.

History 
32 of this class were rebuilt from 4-cylinder compound Class B between 1906 and 1917.  The outside high-pressure cylinders were removed and the inside low-pressure cylinders were re-used, in their original position, to make a two-cylinder simple expansion engine. The boiler pressure was reduced from 200 psi to 160 psi to keep the tractive effort approximately the same.  The rebuilt engines retained their old numbers. Additionally, 60 new Gs were built in 1910. The rebuilt engines were easily distinguished from the new builds by having "piano fronts".

Rebuilding 
The first of the class, LNWR No. 2653, was rebuilt to Class G1 in 1912.  The remaining 91 engines were inherited by the LMS in 1923.  LMS numbers were 9077-9144. The LMS rebuilt them all to Class G1 between May 1924 and 1937, thus rendering the class extinct.

References

Further reading 
 Bob Essery & David Jenkinson An Illustrated Review of LMS Locomotives Vol. 2 Absorbed Pre-Group Classes Western and Central Divisions
 Edward Talbot, The London & North Western Railway Eight-Coupled Goods Engines
 Willie Yeadon, Yeadon's Compendium of LNWR Locomotives Vol 2 Goods Tender Engines

External links 

G
0-8-0 locomotives
Standard gauge steam locomotives of Great Britain
Railway locomotives introduced in 1906
D n2 locomotives